Bogdan George Burcea (born 8 May 1972) is a current Romanian handball coach for SCM Craiova and the Romanian national team, and sports lecturer. He has been a member of the Consiliul Științei Sportului din România since 2012.

International honours
EHF Cup: 
Gold Medalist: 2018 
Bronze Medalist: 2016

Individual awards
 Prosport Coach Of The Year in the Romanian Liga Națională: 2018

Personal life
He comes from a family of handballers. His father, George Burcea, was coach of the female and male teams of the Greek club Filippos Veria. Bogdan's sister is Patricia Burcea-Apostolidou and his former wife is Adela Burcea, both handball players. He trained his ex-wife for several times in her handball career, in different countries.

Burcea holds doctorates and a Master of Performance degree in Physical Education and Sport, and a Master of International Business all from University of Craiova.

He was given the award of Cetățean de onoare ("Honorary Citizen") of the city of Craiova in 2018.

On 31 May 2019, he married his club player Cristina Zamfir.

References

External links
CV at ucv.ro

1972 births
Living people
Sportspeople from Craiova
Romanian handball coaches
Romanian expatriate sportspeople in Cyprus
Romanian expatriate sportspeople in the Faroe Islands
Romanian expatriate sportspeople in Greece
Handball coaches of international teams